Self-organized criticality (SOC) is a property of dynamical systems that have a critical point as an attractor.  Their macroscopic behavior thus displays the spatial or temporal scale-invariance characteristic of the critical point of a phase transition, but without the need to tune control parameters to a precise value, because the system, effectively, tunes itself as it evolves towards criticality.

The concept was put forward by Per Bak, Chao Tang and Kurt Wiesenfeld ("BTW") in a paper 
published in 1987 in Physical Review Letters, and is considered to be one of the mechanisms by which complexity arises in nature.  Its concepts have been applied across fields as diverse as geophysics, physical cosmology, evolutionary biology and ecology, bio-inspired computing and optimization (mathematics), economics, quantum gravity, sociology, solar physics, plasma physics, neurobiology and others.

SOC is typically observed in slowly driven non-equilibrium systems with many degrees of freedom and strongly nonlinear dynamics.  Many individual examples have been identified since BTW's original paper, but to date there is no known set of general characteristics that guarantee a system will display SOC.

Overview 

Self-organized criticality is one of a number of important discoveries made in statistical physics and related fields over the latter half of the 20th century, discoveries which relate particularly to the study of complexity in nature.  For example, the study of cellular automata, from the early discoveries of Stanislaw Ulam and John von Neumann through to John Conway's Game of Life and the extensive work of Stephen Wolfram, made it clear that complexity could be generated as an emergent feature of extended systems with simple local interactions.  Over a similar period of time, Benoît Mandelbrot's large body of work on fractals showed that much complexity in nature could be described by certain ubiquitous mathematical laws, while the extensive study of phase transitions carried out in the 1960s and 1970s showed how scale invariant phenomena such as fractals and power laws emerged at the critical point between phases.

The term self-organized criticality was first introduced in Bak, Tang and Wiesenfeld's 1987 paper, which clearly linked together those factors: a simple cellular automaton was shown to produce several characteristic features observed in natural complexity (fractal geometry, pink (1/f) noise and power laws) in a way that could be linked to critical-point phenomena. Crucially, however, the paper emphasized that the complexity observed emerged in a robust manner that did not depend on finely tuned details of the system: variable parameters in the model could be changed widely without affecting the emergence of critical behavior: hence, self-organized criticality. Thus, the key result of BTW's paper was its discovery of a mechanism by which the emergence of complexity from simple local interactions could be spontaneous—and therefore plausible as a source of natural complexity—rather than something that was only possible in artificial situations in which control parameters are tuned to precise critical values. An alternative view is that SOC appears when the criticality is linked to a value of zero of the control parameters.

Despite the considerable interest and research output generated from the SOC hypothesis, there remains no general agreement with regards to its mechanisms in abstract mathematical form.  Bak Tang and Wiesenfeld based their hypothesis on the behavior of their sandpile model.

Models of self-organized criticality 
In chronological order of development:

 Stick-slip model of fault failure
Bak–Tang–Wiesenfeld sandpile
 Forest-fire model
 Olami–Feder–Christensen model
 Bak–Sneppen model

Early theoretical work included the development of a variety of alternative SOC-generating dynamics distinct from the BTW model, attempts to prove model properties analytically (including calculating the critical exponents), and examination of the conditions necessary for SOC to emerge. One of the important issues for the latter investigation was whether conservation of energy was required in the local dynamical exchanges of models: the answer in general is no, but with (minor) reservations, as some exchange dynamics (such as those of BTW) do require local conservation at least on average .

It has been argued that this model  would actually generate 1/f2 noise rather than 1/f noise. This claim was based on untested scaling assumptions, and a more rigorous analysis showed that sandpile models 
generally produce 1/fa spectra, with a<2.
Other simulation models were proposed later that could produce true 1/f noise.

In addition to the nonconservative theoretical model mentioned above , other theoretical models for SOC have been based upon information theory, 
mean field theory,
the convergence of random variables, and cluster formation. A continuous model of self-organised criticality is proposed by using tropical geometry.

Key theoretical issues yet to be resolved include the calculation of the possible universality classes of SOC behavior and the question of whether it is possible to derive a general rule for determining if an arbitrary algorithm displays SOC.

Self-organized criticality in nature

SOC has become established as a strong candidate for explaining a number of natural phenomena, including: 
 The magnitude of earthquakes (Gutenberg–Richter law) and frequency of aftershocks (Omori law) 
 Fluctuations in economic systems such as financial markets (references to SOC are common in econophysics) 
 The evolution of proteins
 Forest fires 
 Neuronal avalanches in the cortex
 Acoustic emission from fracturing materials

Despite the numerous applications of SOC to understanding natural phenomena, the universality of SOC theory has been questioned. For example, experiments with real piles of rice revealed their dynamics to be far more sensitive to parameters than originally predicted. Furthermore, it has been argued that 1/f scaling in EEG recordings are inconsistent with critical states, and whether SOC is a fundamental property of neural systems remains an open and controversial topic.

Self-organized criticality and optimization
It has been found that the avalanches from an SOC process make effective patterns in a random search for optimal solutions on graphs. 
An example of such an optimization problem is graph coloring. The SOC process apparently helps the optimization from getting stuck in a local optimum without the use of any annealing scheme, as suggested by previous work on extremal optimization.

See also 

 1/f noise
 Complex systems
 Critical brain hypothesis
 Critical exponents
 Detrended fluctuation analysis, a method to detect power-law scaling in time series.
 Dual-phase evolution, another process that contributes to self-organization in complex systems.
 Fractals
 Ilya Prigogine, a systems scientist who helped formalize dissipative system behavior in general terms.
 Power laws
 Red Queen hypothesis
 Scale invariance
 Self-organization
 Self-organized criticality control

References

Further reading 

 
 
 
 
 
  Papercore summary.
 
 
 
 
 
 
 
 
Self-organized criticality on arxiv.org

Critical phenomena
Applied and interdisciplinary physics
Chaos theory
Self-organization